Vashan may refer to:
 Vashan, Hamadan, Iran
 Vashan, South Khorasan, Iran
 Vashan, Tajikistan

See also
 Vashon (disambiguation)